Glasgow Gorbals was a parliamentary constituency in the city of Glasgow.  From 1918 until 1974, it returned one Member of Parliament (MP) to the House of Commons of the Parliament of the United Kingdom, elected by the first-past-the-post system.

Boundaries
The Representation of the People Act 1918 provided that the constituency was to consist of "That portion of the city which is bounded by a line commencing at a point on the municipal boundary at the centre line of the River Clyde about 77 yards east of the centre of Rutherglen Bridge, thence southwestward along the municipal boundary to the centre of the Caledonian Railway Main Line from Glasgow to Rutherglen, thence north-westward along the centre line of the said Caledonian Railway to the centre line of the Glasgow and South Western Railway, thence south-westward along the centre line of the said Glasgow and South Western Railway to the centre line of Victoria Road, thence northward along the centre line of Victoria Road, Eglinton Street, Bridge Street and Glasgow Bridge to the centre line of the River Clyde, thence south-eastward along the centre line of the River Clyde to the point of commencement."

1950–1955: The County of the City of Glasgow wards of Gorbals and Hutchesontown, and part of Govanhill ward.

1955–1974: The County of the City of Glasgow wards of Gorbals and Hutchesontown, and parts of Govanhill and Kingston wards.

Members of Parliament

Election results

Elections in the 1970s

Elections in the 1960s

Elections in the 1950s

Elections in the 1940s

Elections in the 1930s

Elections in the 1920s

Elections in the 1910s

* Barnes did not receive the Coalition Coupon and was therefore an unofficial candidate.

References 

Historic parliamentary constituencies in Scotland (Westminster)
Constituencies of the Parliament of the United Kingdom established in 1918
Constituencies of the Parliament of the United Kingdom disestablished in 1974
Gorbals
Govanhill and Crosshill